Sunil Maitra (1 February 1927 – 18 September 1996), born at Chittagong in Bangladesh,  was a member of the 7th Lok Sabha of India. He represented the Calcutta North East constituency of West Bengal as a member of the Communist Party of India (Marxist) party.  Maitra was also among the leadership of the All India Insurance Employees Association.

References

1927 births
1996 deaths
India MPs 1980–1984
People from Chittagong
Communist Party of India (Marxist) politicians from West Bengal
Lok Sabha members from West Bengal
Politicians from Kolkata